Viviana is a feminine given name.

Arts
Viviana Andreattini (born 1960), stage name Vivien Vee, Italian singer
Viviana Durante (born 1967), Italian ballet dancer
Viviana Gibelli (born 1966, Caracas), Venezuelan entertainer
Viviana Gorbato (1950 – 2005), Argentine journalist, writer, and university professor
Viviana Mazza (born 1978), Italian journalist 
Viviana Guzmán (born 1964), Chilean entertainer
Viviana Ortiz (born 1986), Puerto Rican entertainer
Viviana Ramos, Venezuelan pageant titleholder
Viviana Rivero (born 1966), Argentine writer
Viviana Serna (born 1990), Colombian actress
Viviana Sofronitsky, Canadian pianist
Viviana Spinosa (born 1984), Colombian artist.
Viviana Campanile Zagorianakou (born 1990), Greek beauty pageant contestant

Politics
Viviana Agundiz (born 1968), Mexican politician
Viviana Bonilla (born 1983), Ecuadorian lawyer and politician

Sports
Viviana Ballabio (born 1967), Italian basketball player
Viviana Bontacchio (1959–2012), Italian footballer
Viviana Callahan Vargas (born 1980), Chilean ski mountaineer
Viviana Chávez (born 1987), Argentinean marathon runner
Viviana Ferrari (born 1992), Uruguayan team handball player
Viviana González (born 1958), Argentine tennis player
Viviana Schiavi (born 1982), Italian footballer
Viviana Velásquez, Colombian cyclist

Other
Viviana Alder (born 1957), Argentinian researcher
Viviana Díaz (born 1950), Chilean human rights campaigner
Viviana Zelizer (born 1946), American sociologist
Viviana Zocco (born 1962), Argentine businesswoman

See also

 Vivianna Torun Bülow-Hübe, Swedish silversmith
 Bibiana (disambiguation), a variant of the name
 Vivian (given name), a variant of the name
 Vivien (disambiguation), a variant of the name
 Vivienne, a variant of the name
 Vivianus

Feminine given names